Abdur Rahman Siddiqui, better known as A.R. Siddiqui, is a Pakistani author and former Pakistan Army officer. From March 1967 to November 1973, he served as the director-general of the Inter-Services Public Relations. He retired as a brigadier from Pakistan Army.

Career
Between March 1967 and November 1973, he was the director-general of the Inter-Services Public Relations.

Books
 The Military in Pakistan: Image and Reality
 General Agha Mohammad Yahya Khan: The Rise and Fall of a Soldier
 Making of the Mohajir Mindset
 East Pakistan: The Endgame: An Onlooker's Journal 1969-71

References

Pakistani military writers
Directors-General of the Inter-Services Public Relations
Pakistan Army officers
Year of birth missing
Year of death missing